Samir Ibrahim Kamouna  (born 2 April 1972) is an Egyptian football coach and former player who manages El Minya SC. A former defender, he played for the Egypt national team.

Club career
Kamouna had a spell in German Bundesliga with 1. FC Kaiserslautern, and in the Turkish Super Lig with Bursaspor. His best performance in Egypt was while playing for Al Ahly.

International career
Kamouna received his first international cap with the Egypt national team against Ethiopia on 4 June 1995.

Kamouna played for Egypt in two African Cups of Nations, 1996 African Cup of Nations and 1998 African Cup of Nations. He scored in the first, and Egypt won the latter. He then participated in 1999 FIFA Confederations Cup and scored twice.

Kamouna earned 45 caps scoring eight goals.

International goals
Scores and results list Egypt's goal tally first, score column indicates score after each Kamouna goal.

Honours
Al Mokawloon 
 Egypt Cup: 1994–95 

Al Ahly 
 Egyptian Premier League: 1996–97, 1997–98
 Arab Super Cup: 1997, 1998 
 Egypt Cup: 2002–03

Egypt 
 African Cup of Nations: 1998
 African Youth Cup of Nations: 1991
 1991 FIFA World Youth Championship participation

References

External links

External links
 

1972 births
Living people
Egyptian footballers
Association football defenders
Egypt international footballers
1996 African Cup of Nations players
1998 African Cup of Nations players
1999 FIFA Confederations Cup players
Egyptian Premier League players
Bundesliga players
Al Mokawloon Al Arab SC players
Al Ahly SC players
1. FC Kaiserslautern players
Bursaspor footballers
Al Ittihad Alexandria Club players
Al Masry SC players
Petrojet SC players
Egyptian expatriate footballers
Egyptian expatriate sportspeople in Germany
Expatriate footballers in Germany
Egyptian expatriate sportspeople in Turkey
Expatriate footballers in Turkey
Footballers from Cairo